The 1984 World's Strongest Man was the eighth edition of World's Strongest Man and was won by Jón Páll Sigmarsson from Iceland. It was his first title after finishing second the previous year. Ab Wolders from the Netherlands finished second and, 1983 champion Geoff Capes from the United Kingdom finished third. The contest was held at Mora, Sweden.

Final results

References

External links
 Official site

World's Strongest
World's Strongest Man
1984 in Sweden